Pascal-Adolphe-Jean Dagnan-Bouveret (7 January 1852 – 3 July 1929), was one of the leading French artists of the naturalist school.

Biography

He was born in Paris, the son of a tailor, and was raised by his grandfather after his father emigrated to Brazil. Later he added his grandfather's name, Bouveret, to his own.

He became one of the leading French artists of the naturalist school and painted several paintings depicting Brittany. From 1869 he studied at the École des Beaux-Arts under Alexandre Cabanel and Jean-Léon Gérôme. From 1875 he exhibited at the Salon, where in 1880 he won the first-class medal for the painting  "An Accident" and a medal of honour in 1885 for "Horses at the Watering Trough". From the 1880s Dagnan-Bouveret along with Gustave Courtois, maintained a studio in Neuilly-sur-Seine, a fashionable suburb of Paris. By that time he was recognized as a leading modern artist known for his peasant scenes, but also for his mystical-religious compositions. His large-scale painting "The Last Supper" was exhibited at the Salon de Champ-de-Mars in 1896.  He was one of the first to use the then new medium of photography to bring greater realism to his paintings. In 1891 he was made an Officer of the Legion of Honour and in 1900 he became a member of the Institut de France. A number of his pictures were purchased by the British art collector George McCulloch, including The Madonna and Child 1880, Dans Le Foret, and a copy of La Cene (The Last Supper).

Works

See also
Sara Page (1855–1943), his student.

References

Further reading
Gabriel P.Weisberg. Against the Modern: Dagnan-Bouveret and the Transformation of the Academic Tradition. New York: Dahesh Museum of Art, 2002.

External links

1852 births
1929 deaths
Painters from Paris
19th-century French painters
20th-century French painters
20th-century French male artists
French portrait painters
French genre painters
French male painters
Prix de Rome for painting
École des Beaux-Arts alumni
Officiers of the Légion d'honneur
Members of the Ligue de la patrie française
Honorary Members of the Royal Academy
19th-century French male artists